Maragini is the concluding section of the alapana. The artist sings brisks passages scaling across the entire range of raga.

Indian classical music